Viana do Alentejo is a municipality in the District of Évora in Portugal. The population in 2011 was 5,743, in an area of 393.67 km2.

The present Mayor is Bernardino Bengalinha Pinto, elected by the Socialist Party. The municipal holiday is January 13.

Climate
Viana do Alentejo has a Mediterranean climate (Köppen: Csa) with mild, rainy winters and hot, dry summers.

Parishes
Administratively, the municipality is divided into 3 civil parishes (freguesias):
 Aguiar
 Alcáçovas
 Viana do Alentejo

Notable residents
Notable people from Viana do Alentejo include:
 Joana da Gama (c.1520 – 1586) a Portuguese writer.
 Duarte Lobo (ca.1565 – 1646) a Portuguese composer. 
 Aleixo de Abreu (1568–1630) a Portuguese physician and tropical pathologist.
 António Francisco Cardim (1596–1659) a Jesuit priest, missionary and historian in the Far East.
 António Banha (1941-2011) actor.

Twin towns
Viana do Alentejo is twinned with:

  Igarassu, Brazil
  Porto Seguro, Brazil
  Viana, Brazil

Gallery

References

External links
Town Hall official website

 
Municipalities of Évora District